Hasarambi is a village in Dharwad district of Karnataka, India.

Demographics 
As of the 2011 Census of India there were 200 households in Hasarambi and a total population of 1,186 consisting of 625 males and 561 females. There were 185 children ages 0-6.

References

Villages in Dharwad district